Carmen Goh (born 21 December 1990) is a Singaporean netball player who represents Singapore internationally and plays in the position of center. She was part of the Singaporean squad at the 2019 Netball World Cup, which was also her first World Cup appearance.

In September 2019, she was included in the Singaporean squad for the 2019 M1 Nations Cup and was part of the national team which emerged as runner-up to Namibia in the final.

References 

1990 births
Living people
Singaporean netball players
Southeast Asian Games silver medalists for Singapore
Southeast Asian Games medalists in netball
Competitors at the 2019 Southeast Asian Games
2019 Netball World Cup players
Singaporean sportspeople of Chinese descent
21st-century Singaporean women